Fabas is the name of several communes in France:

 Fabas, Ariège, in the Ariège department
 Fabas, Haute-Garonne, in the Haute-Garonne department
 Fabas, Tarn-et-Garonne, in the Tarn-et-Garonne department

oc:Havars (Arièja)